The 15th Infantry Division (พล.ร.๑๕.) is an infantry division of the Royal Thai Army, it is currently a part of the Fourth Army Area. The unit is composed of the 151st Infantry Regiment, 152nd Infantry Regiment and 153rd Infantry Regiment and Service Support Regiment. The division engaged in the South Thailand insurgency.

History

Southern insurgency (2001–ongoing) 
The ongoing southern insurgency had begun in response to Prime Minister Plaek Phibunsongkhram's 1944 National Cultural Act, which replaced the use of Malaya in the region's schools with the Thai language and also abolished the local Islamic courts in the three ethnic Malay and Muslim majority border provinces of Yala, Pattani, and Narathiwat. However, it had always been on a comparatively small scale. The insurgency intensified in 2001, during the government of Prime Minister Thaksin Shinawatra. Terrorist attacks were now extended to the ethnic Thai minority in the provinces. The Royal Thai Armed Forces also went beyond their orders and retaliated with strong armed tactics that only encouraged more violence. By the end of 2012 the conflict had claimed 3,380 lives, including 2,316 civilians, 372 soldiers, 278 police, 250 suspected insurgents, 157 education officials, and seven Buddhist monks. Many of the dead were Muslims themselves, but they had been targeted because of their presumed support of the Thai government.
The creation of the 15th Infantry Division was announced in January 2005. Defence Minister, General Samphan Boonyanan, was quoted as saying that the new unit, dubbed the "Development Division", would not be a combat unit for fighting Islamic militants, but rather its main mission would be to assist local citizens and develop the region. The military will not ignore its general function of providing safety for the citizens of the region, he added. He said that troops for the new division would undergo training to give them a good understanding of local residents, the vast majority of whom are ethnic Malay Muslims. The division is in fact a transformation of the Pranburi-based 16th Infantry Division. It will now be headquartered at Fort Ingkhayutthaborihan in Pattani, complete with its battalions and companies of military police and communications and aviation personnel, he said. It will also have three separate infantry battalions, one each in Pattani, Yala, and Narathiwat. Each battalion will include three companies of medical, engineering, and psychological warfare personnel, he said. The government will allocate a budget of more than 18 billion baht for the division over the next four years.

The 15th Infantry Division is being established as a permanent force to handle security problems in the Deep South. The division is based in Pattani and is expected to have a combined force of around 10,000. The establishment of this new division, approved by the government in 2005, has yet to be completed. As of this writing, some 7,000 troops deployed in the Deep South are affiliated to this division."

Organization

15th Infantry Division Headquarters
 15th Infantry Division
 151st Infantry Regiment
 1st Infantry Battalion
 2nd Infantry Battalion
 3rd Infantry Battalion
 152nd Infantry Regiment
 1st Infantry Battalion
 2nd Infantry Battalion
 3rd Infantry Battalion
 153rd Infantry Regiment
 1st Infantry Battalion
 2nd Infantry Battalion
 3rd Infantry Battalion
 Support Service Regiment
 Logistic and Service Battalion
 Maintenance Battalion
 Medical Battalion
 Psychological Operations Company
 31st Cavalry Squadron
 15th Combat Engineer Battalion
 15th Long Range Reconnaissance Patrols Company
 15th Signal Corp Battalion

See also
 1st Division (Thailand)
 2nd Infantry Division (Thailand)
 4th Infantry Division (Thailand)
 5th Infantry Division (Thailand)
 7th Infantry Division (Thailand)
 9th Infantry Division (Thailand)
 Royal Thai Marine Corps
 King's Guard (Thailand)
 Royal Thai Army
 Thai Royal Guards parade

References

Infantry divisions of Thailand
Military units and formations established in 2007
2007 establishments in Thailand